The Story-Teller was a monthly British pulp fiction magazine from 1907 to 1937. The Story-Teller is notable for having published some of the works of prominent authors, including G. K. Chesterton, William Hope Hodgson, Rudyard Kipling, Katherine Mansfield, Sax Rohmer, Edgar Wallace, H. G. Wells, Oliver Onions, Bernard Capes, Hall Caine, Marjorie Bowen, E. Phillips Oppenheim, Alice & Claude Askew, and Tom Gallon.

Publishing history
Initially published by Cassell & Co, The Story-Teller was edited by Newman Flower from its debut in April 1907 until 1928, when Clarence Winchester became the editor. In May 1927, the magazine changed his name in Storyteller when it began to be published by Amalgamated Press and, later on, merged with Cassell's Magazine in 1932.

The magazine's last issue was in November 1937. In all, 367 issues were published during its 30-year life.

References

Andrew Nash. "The Production of the Novel, 1880–1940". In Patrick Parrinder and Andrzej Gasiorek (eds, 2011). The Oxford History of the Novel in English: Volume 4: The Reinvention of the British and Irish Novel, 1880–1940. Oxford: Oxford University Press at 3–19.

Magazines established in 1907
Magazines disestablished in 1937
Pulp magazines
Defunct literary magazines published in the United Kingdom
Monthly magazines published in the United Kingdom